Little Britches Rodeo is a non-fiction television series produced by Hodge Media Group for RFD-TV. It portrays the real life events during National Little Britches Rodeo Association Finals. This western lifestyle documents the lives of rodeo contestants and rodeo competition from the Finals. In addition, it features interviews with PRCA World Champions, contestants, parents, rodeo personal, and some of the industry leaders in agriculture, horse industry, and rodeo.

Format 
Every episode features rodeo performances from one event at the NLBRA Finals. Commentary is provided for each rodeo ride/run. Each episode also features multiple interviews. Finally, each episode concludes with an interview with the world champion of the event featured in the episode.

Narration 
Every episode has been narrated by Donna Hodge.

Production 

The first 4 seasons were filmed at the Colorado State Fairgrounds in Pueblo, Colorado. Season 5-8 were filmed at the Lazy E in Guthrie, Oklahoma.

The NLBRA Finals has rodeo events running simultaneously in three different arenas. A two-person camera crew covers each arena. Camera teams also cover rodeo action from the rough stock chutes and on the arena floor. Several two-camera crews roam grounds, camping areas, and stalls to pick up b-roll, and man on the street interviews. A three-person camera crew also conducts sit down interviews in a studio space.

Subject Matter

Rural Lifestyle 

The series focuses on issues impacting rural lifestyles from communities around the United States.

Competition 
National Little Britches Rodeo Association is the starting organization for many professional cowboys.

Society of Rodeo Families 
One of the series’ focuses is the importance of extended family. The community aspect of the western lifestyle is highlighted.

Notable guests
 Martha Josey - Women's Professional Rodeo Association World Champion
Fallon Taylor - Women's Professional Rodeo Association World Champion
Mary Fallin - Governor of Oklahoma
Jim Reese - Oklahoma Secretary of Agriculture 
Chuck Hall - Oklahoma State Senator
Garry Mize - Oklahoma House of Representatives 
Amberley Snyder - Barrel Racer & Motivational Speaker
Blayne Arthur - Oklahoma Secretary of Agriculture
 John McBeth - ProRodeo Hall of Fame inductee
 Clint Corey - ProRodeo Hall of Fame inductee
 Joe Beaver - Professional Rodeo Cowboys Association World Champion
 Jerod Johnston - Professional Rodeo Cowboys Association contestant
 P. J. Burger - Women's Professional Rodeo Association contestant
 Sherrylnn Johnson - Women's Professional Rodeo Association contestant
 Mike Johnson - Professional Rodeo Cowboys Association contestant
 Jett Johnson - Professional Rodeo Cowboys Association World Champion
 Bobby Griswold - Professional Rodeo Cowboys Association contestant
 Butch Morgan - Western Horseman
 Kent Sturman - Director of ProRodeo Hall of Fame
 Steve Miller - Montana Silversmiths
 R.E. Josey - AQHA World Champion
 Sarah Wiens - Miss Rodeo Colorado 2013
 Madeline Mills - Miss Rodeo Colorado 2016
 Taylor Spears Miss Rodeo Oklahoma 2018 & Miss Rodeo America 2019 First Runner-up
Mike Poland - Cactus Ropes General Manager
 Keith Dundee - President of American Hats
 Jerry Moore - Five Star Equine
 April Patterson - Rodeo Fame
 Tom Spaulding - Spaulding Labs
 Bob Norris - Noble Equine
Janet Honeycutt Boyt - Rodeo Producer

Episodes

Spin-off
Little Britches on the Road - A travel show focusing on rural aspects of the United States.

References

External links 
 Little Britches Rodeo on RFD-TV
 

English-language television shows
First-run syndicated television programs in the United States
Rural society in the United States
Television shows set in Oklahoma
Television shows set in Colorado
American sports television series